Kokomo is an unincorporated area In Lee County, Arkansas, United States. Its zip code is 72320. On the U.S. Geological Survey Map, Kokomo appears on the Mud Lake map.

References

Lee County, Arkansas